In molecular biology, elastase is an enzyme from the class of proteases (peptidases) that break down proteins. In particular, it is a serine protease.

Forms and classification
Eight human genes exist for elastase:

Some bacteria (including Pseudomonas aeruginosa) also produce elastase.  In bacteria, elastase is considered a virulence factor.

Function 
Elastase breaks down elastin, an elastic fibre that, together with collagen, determines the mechanical properties of connective tissue. The neutrophil form breaks down the Outer membrane protein A (OmpA) of E. coli and other Gram-negative bacteria. Elastase also has the important immunological role of breaking down Shigella virulence factors.  This is accomplished through the cleavage of peptide bonds in the target proteins.  The specific peptide bonds cleaved are those on the carboxyl side of small, hydrophobic amino acids such as glycine, alanine, and valine.  For more on how this is accomplished, see serine protease.

The role of human elastase in disease

A1AT 
Elastase is inhibited by the acute-phase protein α1-antitrypsin (A1AT), which binds almost irreversibly to the active site of elastase and trypsin. A1AT is normally secreted by the liver cells into the serum. Alpha-1 antitrypsin deficiency (A1AD) leads to uninhibited destruction of elastic fibre by elastase; the main result is emphysema.

Cyclic neutropenia 
The rare disease cyclic neutropenia (also called "cyclic hematopoeiesis") is an autosomal dominant genetic disorder characterised by fluctuating neutrophil granulocyte counts over 21-day periods. During neutropenia, patients are at risk for infections. In 1999, this disease was linked to disorders in the ELA-2 / ELANE gene. Other forms of congenital neutropenia also appear to be linked to ELA-2 mutations.

Other diseases 
Neutrophil elastase is responsible for the blistering in bullous pemphigoid, a skin condition, in the presence of antibodies.  It may also play a role in the formation of abdominal aortic aneurysms (AAAs) and chronic obstructive pulmonary disease (COPD).

The role of bacterial elastase in disease 
Elastase has been shown to disrupt tight junctions, cause proteolytic damage to tissue, break down cytokines and alpha proteinase inhibitor, cleave immunoglobulin A and G (IgA, IgG), and cleave both C3bi, a component of the complement system, and CR1, a receptor on neutrophils for another complement molecule involved in phagocytosis. The cleavage of IgA, IgG, C3bi, and CR1 contributes to a decrease of the ability of neutrophils to kill bacteria by phagocytosis. Together, all these factors contribute to human pathology.

References

External links
  GeneReviews/NCBI/NIH/UW entry on ELANE-Related Neutropenias including cyclic neutropenia

EC 3.4.21
Proteases